Southbound Train is a 1981 Croatian comedy-drama film directed by , starring Marina Nemet, Zlatko Vitez, and Franjo Majetić.

Sources

 Vlakom prema jugu at lzmk.hr 
 Vlakom prema jugu at hrfilm.hr

External links
 

1981 films
1980s Croatian-language films
Films set in Zagreb
1981 comedy-drama films
Croatian comedy-drama films
Yugoslav comedy-drama films
Zagreb Film films
1981 comedy films
1981 drama films